Léopold Desmet (born 15 July 1935) is a Belgian gymnast. He competed in seven events at the 1960 Summer Olympics.

References

External links
 

1935 births
Living people
Belgian male artistic gymnasts
Olympic gymnasts of Belgium
Gymnasts at the 1960 Summer Olympics
Sportspeople from Brussels